TV-B-Gone is a universal remote control device for turning off a large majority—about 85%—of the available brands of television sets in 2015. It was created to allow people in a public place to turn off nearby television sets. Its inventor has referred to it as "an environmental management device". The device is part of a key-chain, and, like other remote devices, is battery-powered. Although it can require up to 72 seconds for the device to find the proper code for a particular television receiver, the most popular televisions turn off in the first few seconds.

History 
TV-B-Gone was invented by Mitch Altman and is sold by his company Cornfield Electronics. Altman was one of the pioneers of virtual reality, working with Jaron Lanier at VPL Research, and it was during his research in this field that he started to believe in the hypnotic power of television programs. The standard model TV-B-Gone consists of an infra-red LED, two CR2032 cells and an integrated circuit containing the television power code database, all in a plastic case. The original case aesthetics and design were created by Robert Ellis.

Models

TV-B-Gone Pro SHP 
The TV-B-Gone Pro SHP (Super High Power) is the latest TV-B-Gone to be announced. It is considerably more powerful than the standard model, using eight infra-red LEDs to allow TVs to be turned off from distances of up to 100 meters (300 feet). TV-B-Gone Pro SHP is switchable between its North American and European databases of POWER codes. Later, in 2009, Mitch Altman made a new kind of TV-B-Gone Pro SHP. Instead of disguising it as an iPhone, Mitch Altman has made the new and improved TV-B-Gone look like an iPod Nano and go ten more yards than the old one.

The recent invention of >1W 850 and 970 nm IREDs makes a miniature long range version of the TV-B-Gone feasible.

TV-B-Gone Kit 
At several hacker conventions Mitch Altman has run workshops that allow participants to build their own TV-B-Gones using Adafruit Industries' micro controller–based mini-POV kit. Around January 2008, Adafruit Industries released a kit to build an open source TV-B-Gone.

Consumer Electronics Show controversy 
During the 2008 Consumer Electronics Show, an individual associated with Gizmodo brought a TV-B-Gone remote control and shut off many display monitors at booths and during demos affecting several companies. These actions caused the individual to be banned for life from future CES events.

See also

 Four Arguments for the Elimination of Television—a book about the inherent problems with television as a medium
 TV turnoff
 White Dot

References

External links
 TV-B-Gone at Cornfield Electronics, Inc.
 TV-B-Gone Kit at Adafruit Industries
 Schematics
 Sabotaging Television With A Click
 TV-B-Gone DIY
 Schematic, firmware, board layout
 TV-B-Gone DIY with ATmega48/88
 TV-B-Off Android application

Consumer electronics
History of television
Open hardware electronic devices
Television technology
Television criticism